John Walter Beasley (born April 6, 1945) is a former professional American football player. A 6'3",  tight end from the University of California at Berkeley, Beasley was selected by the Minnesota Vikings in the 1967 NFL Draft.

Following his National Football League career, Beasley worked as a color commentator for the USA Network and called, along with Barry Tompkins, The Play in 1982, when Cal scored on the last play of the game to defeat Stanford 25-20.

References

1945 births
Living people
Players of American football from Pasadena, California
American football tight ends
California Golden Bears football players
Minnesota Vikings players
New Orleans Saints players
American sports announcers